Inskaya railway station is a classification yard, or marshaling yard, located in Pervomaysky City District of Novosibirsk, Russia. It is one of the largest marshaling yards in Russia and the former Soviet Union.   It is located on the Ob-Proektnaya railway line which connects the Kuznetsk Basin and the Trans-Siberian Railway.  Over 27,000 railway cars pass through the yard daily.

References

Railway stations in Novosibirsk
Railway stations in Russia opened in 1933
Pervomaysky District, Novosibirsk